Caribous-de-Val-d'Or Biodiversity Reserve is a biodiversity reserve located in Abitibi-Témiscamingue, Quebec, Canada, less than  southeast of the city of Val d'Or. It was established on April 28, 2009. The largest lake in the reserve is Sabourin Lake.

Geography

It can be accessed via a major forest road (Chemin Twin) and other forest roads from the north and east via Quebec Route 117. The southwest is bordered by the Caribous-de-Jourdan Ecological Reserve and part of the southeast is bordered by the Ottawa River.

Purpose

The purpose of the reserve is to protect the caribou (there are currently around 30 within the reserve), which was once abundant in southern Quebec. The population of caribou within the reserve is one of the most threatened in Quebec, due to a variety of factors, such as its size, fragmentation, isolation and predation by the wolf.

Flora and fauna

Other wildlife within the reserve include black lichen peatlands and spruce forests, which are essential. There are also 51 species of bird, with 43 of them nesting in the reserve; there are also cranes and sharp-tailed grouses.

There is a huge diversity of mammals, including the black bear, North American porcupine, wolf, lynx, raccoon, coyote, moose and caribou. Within Sabourin Lake, there are twelve species of fish.

Protective measures

There have been protective measures within the reserve to preserve the caribou population, such as the hunting and trapping of their main predators such as black bears and wolves. The number of moose is also being reduced.

References

IUCN Category III
Protected areas established in 2009
Protected areas of Abitibi-Témiscamingue